

Events

Pre-1600
1096 – Pope Urban II confirms the foundation of the abbey of La Roë under Robert of Arbrissel as a community of canons regular.
1404 – The Italian professor Galeazzo di Santa Sophie performed the first post-mortem autopsy for the purposes of teaching and demonstration at the Heiligen–Geist Spital in Vienna. 
1429 – English forces under Sir John Fastolf defend a supply convoy carrying rations to the army besieging Orléans in the Battle of the Herrings.
1502 – Isabella I issues an edict outlawing Islam in the Crown of Castile, forcing virtually all her Muslim subjects to convert to Christianity.
  1502   – Vasco da Gama sets sail with 15 ships and 800 men from Lisbon, Portugal on his second voyage to India.
1541 – Santiago, Chile is founded by Pedro de Valdivia.
1593 – Japanese invasion of Korea: Approximately 3,000 Joseon defenders led by general Kwon Yul successfully repel more than 30,000 Japanese forces in the Siege of Haengju.

1601–1900
1689 – The Convention Parliament declares that the flight to France in 1688 by James II, the last Roman Catholic British monarch, constitutes an abdication.
1733 – Georgia Day: Englishman James Oglethorpe founds Georgia, the 13th colony of the Thirteen Colonies, by settling at Savannah.
1771 – Gustav III becomes the King of Sweden.
1817 – An Argentine/Chilean patriotic army, after crossing the Andes, defeats Spanish troops at the Battle of Chacabuco.
1818 – Bernardo O'Higgins formally approves the Chilean Declaration of Independence near Concepción, Chile.
1825 – The Creek cede the last of their lands in Georgia to the United States government by the Treaty of Indian Springs, and migrate west.
1832 – Ecuador annexes the Galápagos Islands.
1855 – Michigan State University is established.
1889 – Antonín Dvořák's Jakobín is premiered at National Theater in Prague
1894 – Anarchist Émile Henry hurls a bomb into the Cafe Terminus in Paris, killing one person and wounding 20.

1901–present
1909 – The National Association for the Advancement of Colored People (NAACP) is founded.
1912 – The Xuantong Emperor, the last Emperor of China, abdicates.
1915 – In Washington, D.C., the first stone of the Lincoln Memorial is put into place.
1919 – The Second Regional Congress of Peasants, Workers and Insurgents is held by the Makhnovshchina at Huliaipole.
1921 – Bolsheviks launch a revolt in Georgia as a preliminary to the Red Army invasion of Georgia. 
1924 – George Gershwin's Rhapsody in Blue received its premiere in a concert titled "An Experiment in Modern Music", in Aeolian Hall, New York, by Paul Whiteman and his band, with Gershwin playing the piano.
1935 – , one of the two largest helium-filled airships ever created, crashes into the Pacific Ocean off the coast of California and sinks.
1946 – World War II: Operation Deadlight ends after scuttling 121 of 154 captured U-boats.
  1946   – African American United States Army veteran Isaac Woodard is severely beaten by a South Carolina police officer to the point where he loses his vision in both eyes. The incident later galvanizes the civil rights movement and partially inspires Orson Welles' film Touch of Evil.
1947 – The largest observed iron meteorite until that time creates an impact crater in Sikhote-Alin, in the Soviet Union.
  1947   – Christian Dior unveils a "New Look", helping Paris regain its position as the capital of the fashion world.
1961 – The Soviet Union launches Venera 1 towards Venus.
1963 – Construction begins on the Gateway Arch in St. Louis, Missouri.
1963   – Northwest Orient Airlines Flight 705 crashes into the Everglades shortly after takeoff from Miami International Airport, killing all 45 people on board.
1965 – Malcolm X visits Smethwick near Birmingham following the racially-charged 1964 United Kingdom general election.
1968 – Phong Nhị and Phong Nhất massacre.
1974 – Aleksandr Solzhenitsyn, winner of the Nobel Prize in Literature in 1970, is exiled from the Soviet Union.
1983 – One hundred women protest in Lahore, Pakistan against military dictator Zia-ul-Haq's proposed Law of Evidence. The women were tear-gassed, baton-charged and thrown into lock-up. The women were successful in repealing the law.
1988 – Cold War: The 1988 Black Sea bumping incident: The U.S. missile cruiser  is intentionally rammed by the Soviet frigate Bezzavetnyy in the Soviet territorial waters, while Yorktown claims innocent passage.
1990 – Carmen Lawrence becomes the first female Premier in Australian history when she becomes Premier of Western Australia.
1992 – The current Constitution of Mongolia comes into effect.
1993 – Two-year-old James Bulger is abducted from New Strand Shopping Centre by two ten-year-old boys, who later torture and murder him.
1994 – Four thieves break into the National Gallery of Norway and steal Edvard Munch's iconic painting The Scream.
1999 – United States President Bill Clinton is acquitted by the United States Senate in his impeachment trial.
2001 – NEAR Shoemaker spacecraft touches down in the "saddle" region of 433 Eros, becoming the first spacecraft to land on an asteroid.
2002 – The trial of Slobodan Milošević, the former President of the Federal Republic of Yugoslavia, begins at the United Nations International Criminal Tribunal for the former Yugoslavia in The Hague, Netherlands. He dies four years later before its conclusion.
  2002   – An Iran Airtour Tupolev Tu-154 crashes in the mountains outside Khorramabad, Iran while descending for a landing at Khorramabad Airport, killing 119.
2004 – The city of San Francisco begins issuing marriage licenses to same-sex couples in response to a directive from Mayor Gavin Newsom.
2009 – Colgan Air Flight 3407 crashes into a house in Clarence Center, New York while on approach to Buffalo Niagara International Airport, killing all on board and one on the ground.
2016 – Pope Francis and Patriarch Kirill sign an Ecumenical Declaration in the first such meeting between leaders of the Catholic and Russian Orthodox Churches since their split in 1054.
2019 – The country known as the Republic of Macedonia renames itself the Republic of North Macedonia in accordance with the Prespa agreement, settling a long-standing naming dispute with Greece.

Births

Pre-1600
AD 41 – Britannicus, Roman son of Claudius (d. 55)
 528 – Daughter of Emperor Xiaoming of Northern Wei, nominal empress regnant of Northern Wei
 661 – Princess Ōku of Japan (d. 702)
1074 – Conrad II of Italy (d. 1101)
1218 – Kujo Yoritsune, Japanese shōgun (d. 1256)
1322 – John Henry, Margrave of Moravia (d. 1375)
1443 – Giovanni II Bentivoglio, Italian noble (d. 1508)
1480 – Frederick II of Legnica, Duke of Legnica (d. 1547)
1540 – Won Gyun, Korean general and admiral (d. 1597)
1567 – Thomas Campion, English composer, poet, and physician (d. 1620)
1584 – Caspar Barlaeus, Dutch historian, poet, and theologian (d. 1648)

1601–1900
1606 – John Winthrop the Younger, English-American lawyer and politician, Governor of Connecticut (d. 1676)
1608 – Daniello Bartoli, Italian Jesuit priest (d. 1685)
1637 – Jan Swammerdam, Dutch biologist and zoologist (d. 1680)
1663 – Cotton Mather, English-American minister and author (d. 1728)
1665 – Rudolf Jakob Camerarius, German botanist and physician (d. 1721)
1704 – Charles Pinot Duclos, French author (d. 1772)
1706 – Johann Joseph Christian, German Baroque sculptor and woodcarver (d. 1777)
1728 – Étienne-Louis Boullée, French architect (d. 1799)
1753 – François-Paul Brueys d'Aigalliers, French admiral (d. 1798)
1761 – Jan Ladislav Dussek, Czech pianist and composer (d. 1812)
1768 – Francis II, Holy Roman Emperor (d. 1835)
1775 – Louisa Adams, 6th First Lady of the United States (d. 1852)
1777 – Bernard Courtois, French chemist and academic (d. 1838)
  1777   – Friedrich de la Motte Fouqué, German author and poet (d. 1843)
1785 – Pierre Louis Dulong, French physicist and chemist (d. 1838)
1787 – Norbert Provencher, Canadian bishop and missionary (d. 1853)
1788 – Carl Reichenbach, German chemist and philosopher (d. 1869)
1791 – Peter Cooper, American businessman and philanthropist, founded Cooper Union (d. 1883)
1794 – Alexander Petrov, Russian chess player and composer (d. 1867)
  1794   – Valentín Canalizo, Mexican general and politician (d. 1850)
1804 – Heinrich Lenz, German-Italian physicist and academic (d. 1865)
1809 – Charles Darwin, English geologist and theorist (d. 1882)
  1809   – Abraham Lincoln, American lawyer and statesman, 16th President of the United States (d. 1865)
1819 – William Wetmore Story, American sculptor, architect, poet and editor
1824 – Dayananda Saraswati, Indian monk and philosopher, founded Arya Samaj (d. 1883)
1828 – George Meredith, English novelist and poet (d. 1909)
1837 – Thomas Moran, British-American painter and printmaker of the Hudson River School (d. 1926)
1857 – Eugène Atget, French photographer (d. 1927)
  1857   – Bobby Peel, English cricketer and coach (d. 1943)
1861 – Lou Andreas-Salomé, Russian-German psychoanalyst and author (d. 1937)
1866 – Lev Shestov, Russian philosopher (d. 1938)
1869 – Kiến Phúc, Vietnamese emperor (d. 1884)
1870 – Marie Lloyd, English actress and singer (d. 1922)
1876 – 13th Dalai Lama (d. 1933)
1877 – Louis Renault, French engineer and businessman, co-founded Renault (d. 1944)
1880 – George Preca, Maltese priest and saint (d. 1962)
1880 – John L. Lewis, American miner and union leader (d. 1969)
1881 – Anna Pavlova, Russian-English ballerina and actress (d. 1931)
1882 – Walter Nash, English-New Zealand lawyer and politician, 27th Prime Minister of New Zealand (d. 1968)
1884 – Max Beckmann, German painter and sculptor (d. 1950)
  1884   – Johan Laidoner, Estonian-Russian general (d. 1953)
  1884   – Alice Roosevelt Longworth, American author (d. 1980)
  1884   – Marie Vassilieff, Russian-French painter (d. 1957)
1885 – James Scott, American composer (d. 1938)
  1885   – Julius Streicher, German publisher, founded Der Stürmer (d. 1946)
1889 – Bhante Dharmawara, Cambodian monk, lawyer, and judge (d. 1999)
1893 – Omar Bradley, American general (d. 1981)
1895 – Kristian Djurhuus, Faroese lawyer and politician, 2nd Prime Minister of the Faroe Islands (d. 1984)
1897 – Charles Groves Wright Anderson, South African-Australian colonel and politician (d. 1988)
  1897   – Lincoln LaPaz, American astronomer and academic (d. 1985)
1898 – Wallace Ford, English-American actor and singer (d. 1966)
1900 – Roger J. Traynor, American lawyer and jurist, 23rd Chief Justice of California (d. 1983)

1901–present
1902 – William Collier, Jr., American actor, producer, and screenwriter (d. 1987)
1903 – Jorge Basadre, Peruvian historian (d. 1980)
  1903   – Chick Hafey, American baseball player and manager (d. 1973)
1904 – Ted Mack, American radio and television host (d. 1976)
1907 – Joseph Kearns, American actor (d. 1962)
1908 – Jean Effel, French painter, caricaturist, illustrator and journalist (d. 1982)
  1908   – Jacques Herbrand, French mathematician and philosopher (d. 1931)
1909 – Zoran Mušič, Slovene painter and illustrator (d. 2005)
  1909   – Sigmund Rascher, German physician (d. 1945)
1911 – Charles Mathiesen, Norwegian speed skater (d. 1994)
1912 – R. F. Delderfield, English author and playwright (d. 1972)
1914 – Tex Beneke, American singer, saxophonist, and bandleader (d. 2000)
  1914   – Johanna von Caemmerer, German mathematician (d. 1971)
1915 – Lorne Greene, Canadian-American actor (d. 1987)
  1915   – Olivia Hooker, American sailor (d. 2018)
1916 – Joseph Alioto, American lawyer and politician, 36th Mayor of San Francisco (d. 1998)
1917 – Al Cervi, American basketball player and coach (d. 2009)
  1917   – Dom DiMaggio, American baseball player (d. 2009)
1918 – Norman Farberow, American psychologist and academic (d. 2015)
  1918   – Julian Schwinger, American physicist and academic, Nobel Prize laureate (d. 1994)
1919 – Forrest Tucker, American actor (d. 1986)
1920 – Raymond Mhlaba, South African anti-apartheid and ANC activist (d. 2005)
1922 – Hussein Onn, Malaysian lawyer and politician, 3rd Prime Minister of Malaysia (d. 1990)
1923 – Franco Zeffirelli, Italian director, producer, and politician (d. 2019)
1925 – Sir Anthony Berry, British Conservative politician (d. 1984)
  1925   – Joan Mitchell, American-French painter (d. 1992)
1926 – Rolf Brem, Swiss sculptor and illustrator (d. 2014)
  1926   – Joe Garagiola, Sr., American baseball player and sportscaster (d. 2016)
  1926   – Charles Van Doren, American academic (d. 2019)
1928 – Vincent Montana, Jr., American drummer and composer (d. 2013)
1930 – John Doyle, Irish hurler and politician (d. 2010)
  1930   – Arlen Specter, American lieutenant, lawyer, and politician (d. 2012)
1931 – Janwillem van de Wetering, Dutch-American author and translator (d. 2008)
1932 – Axel Jensen, Norwegian author and poet (d. 2003)
  1932   – Julian Simon, American economist, author, and academic (d. 1998)
1933 – Ivan Anikeyev, Soviet cosmonaut (d. 1992)
  1933   – Costa-Gavras, Greek-French director and producer
  1933   – Brian Carlson, Australian rugby league player (d. 1987)
1934 – Annette Crosbie, Scottish actress
  1934   – Anne Osborn Krueger, American economist and academic
  1934   – Bill Russell, American basketball player and coach (d. 2022)
1935 – Gene McDaniels, American singer-songwriter and producer (d. 2011)
1936 – Alan Ebringer, Australian immunologist
1938 – Judy Blume, Jewish-American author and educator
1939 – Leon Kass, American physician, scientist, and educator
  1939   – Ray Manzarek, American singer-songwriter, keyboard player, and producer (d. 2013)
1941 – Dominguinhos, Brazilian singer-songwriter and accordion player (d. 2013)
  1941   – Naomi Uemura, Japanese mountaineer and explorer (d. 1984)
1942 – Ehud Barak, Israeli general and politician, 10th Prime Minister of Israel
  1942   – Pat Dobson, American baseball player, coach, and manager (d. 2006)
1945 – Maud Adams, Swedish model and actress
  1945   – David D. Friedman, American economist, physicist, and scholar
1946 – Jean Eyeghé Ndong, Gabonese politician, Prime Minister of Gabon
  1946   – Ajda Pekkan, Turkish singer-songwriter and actress
1948 – Ray Kurzweil, American computer scientist and engineer
  1948   – Nicholas Soames, English politician, Minister of State for the Armed Forces
1949 – Gundappa Viswanath, Indian cricketer
1950 – Angelo Branduardi, Italian singer-songwriter and guitarist
  1950   – Steve Hackett, English singer-songwriter, guitarist, and producer 
  1950   – Michael Ironside, Canadian actor, director, and screenwriter
1952 – Simon MacCorkindale, English actor, director, and producer (d. 2010)
  1952   – Michael McDonald, American singer-songwriter and keyboard player 
1953 – Joanna Kerns, American actress and director
1954 – Joseph Jordania, Georgian-Australian musicologist and academic
  1954   – Tzimis Panousis, Greek comedian, singer, and author (d. 2018)
  1954   – Phil Zimmermann, American cryptographer and programmer
1955 – Bill Laswell, American bass player and producer 
  1955   – Chet Lemon, American baseball player and coach
1956 – Arsenio Hall, American actor and talk show host
  1956   – Ad Melkert, Dutch lawyer and politician, Dutch Minister of Social Affairs and Employment
  1956   – Brian Robertson, Scottish rock guitarist and songwriter
1958 – Outback Jack, Australian-American wrestler
1961 – Di Farmer, Queensland Member of Parliament
  1961   – David Graeber, American anthropologist and Occupy activist (d. 2020)
  1961   – Jim Harris, Canadian environmentalist and politician
  1961   – Michel Martelly, Haitian singer and politician, 56th President of Haiti
1964 – Omar Hakim, American drummer, producer, arranger, and composer
1965 – Rubén Amaro, Jr., American baseball player and manager
  1965   – Christine Elise, American actress and producer
  1965   – Brett Kavanaugh, American lawyer and jurist, Associate Justice of the Supreme Court of the United States
  1965   – David Westlake, English singer-songwriter and guitarist 
1966 – Paul Crook, American guitarist, songwriter, and producer
1968 – Josh Brolin, American actor 
  1968   – Chynna Phillips, American singer and actress 
1969 – Darren Aronofsky, American director, producer, and screenwriter
  1969   – Alemayehu Atomsa, Ethiopian educator and politician (d. 2014)
  1969   – Steve Backley, English javelin thrower
  1969   – Anneli Drecker, Norwegian singer and actress 
  1969   – Hong Myung-bo, South Korean footballer and manager
1970 – Jim Creeggan, Canadian singer-songwriter and bass player 
  1970   – Bryan Roy, Dutch footballer and manager
  1970   – Judd Winick, American author and illustrator
1971 – Scott Menville, American voice actor, singer, actor and musician
1973 – Gianni Romme, Dutch speed skater
  1973   – Tara Strong, Canadian voice actress and singer
1974 – Naseem Hamed, English boxer
1976 – Christian Cullen, New Zealand rugby player
1977 – Jimmy Conrad, American soccer player and manager
1978 – Paul Anderson, English actor
  1978   – Brett Hodgson, Australian rugby league player and coach
1979 – Antonio Chatman, American football player
  1979   – Jesse Spencer, Australian actor and violinist
1980 – Juan Carlos Ferrero, Spanish tennis player
  1980   – Sarah Lancaster, American actress
  1980   – Christina Ricci, American actress and producer
  1980   – Gucci Mane, American rapper
1981 – Wade McKinnon, Australian rugby league player
1982 – Jonas Hiller, Swiss ice hockey player
  1982   – Louis Tsatoumas, Greek long jumper
  1982   – Anthony Tuitavake, New Zealand rugby player
1983 – Carlton Brewster, American football player and coach
1984 – Brad Keselowski, American race car driver
  1984   – Andrei Sidorenkov, Estonian footballer
  1984   – Peter Vanderkaay, American swimmer
1987 – Jérémy Chardy, French tennis player
1988 – DeMarco Murray, American football player
  1988   – Nicolás Otamendi, Argentine footballer
  1988   – Mike Posner, American singer-songwriter and producer
1990 – Robert Griffin III, American football player
1991 – Patrick Herrmann, German footballer
1992 – Magda Linette, Polish tennis player
1994 – Arman Hall, American sprinter
1999 – Maggie Coles-Lyster, Canadian cyclist
2000 – Kim Ji-min, South Korean actress

Deaths

Pre-1600
 821 – Benedict of Aniane, French monk and saint (b. 747)
 890 – Henjō, Japanese priest and poet (b. 816)
 981 – Ælfstan, bishop of Ramsbury
 901 – Antony II, patriarch of Constantinople
 914 – Li, empress of Yan
 941 – Wulfhelm, Archbishop of Canterbury
1247 – Ermesinde, Countess of Luxembourg, ruler (b. 1185)
1266 – Amadeus of the Amidei, Italian saint
1517 – Catherine of Navarre (b. 1468)
1538 – Albrecht Altdorfer, German painter, engraver, and architect (b. 1480)
1554 – Lord Guildford Dudley, English son of Jane Dudley, Duchess of Northumberland (b. 1536; executed)
  1554   – Lady Jane Grey, de facto monarch of England and Ireland for nine days (b. 1537; executed)
1571 – Nicholas Throckmorton, English politician and diplomat (b. 1515)
1590 – François Hotman, French lawyer and author (b. 1524)
1600 – Edward Denny, Knight Banneret of Bishop's Stortford, English soldier, privateer and adventurer (b. 1547)

1601–1900
1612 – Jodocus Hondius, Flemish cartographer (b. 1563)
1624 – George Heriot, Scottish goldsmith and philanthropist, founded George Heriot's School (b. 1563)
1713 – Jahandar Shah, Mughal emperor (b. 1664)
1728 – Agostino Steffani, Italian priest and composer (b. 1653)
1763 – Pierre de Marivaux, French author and playwright (b. 1688)
1771 – Adolf Frederick, King of Sweden (b. 1710)
1789 – Ethan Allen, American farmer, general, and politician (b. 1738)
1804 – Immanuel Kant, German anthropologist, philosopher, and academic (b. 1724)
1834 – Friedrich Schleiermacher, German philosopher and scholar (b. 1768)
1839 – Moulvi Syed Qudratullah, Bengali judge (b. 1750)
1886 – Randolph Caldecott, English-American painter and illustrator (b. 1846)
1894 – Hans von Bülow, German pianist, composer, and conductor (b. 1830)
1896 – Ambroise Thomas, French composer and academic (b. 1811)

1901–present
1912 – Gerhard Armauer Hansen, Norwegian physician (b. 1841)
1915 – Émile Waldteufel, French pianist, composer, and conductor (b. 1837)
1916 – Richard Dedekind, German mathematician, philosopher, and academic (b. 1831)
1929 – Lillie Langtry, English singer and actress (b. 1853)
1931 – Samad bey Mehmandarov, Azerbaijani-Russian general and politician, 3rd Azerbaijani Minister of Defense (b. 1855)
1935 – Auguste Escoffier, French chef and author (b. 1846)
1942 – Eugene Esmonde, Irish-English lieutenant and pilot, Victoria Cross recipient (b. 1909)
  1942   – Avraham Stern, Polish-Israeli militant leader (b. 1907)
  1942   – Grant Wood, American painter and academic (b. 1891)
1947 – Moses Gomberg, Ukrainian-American chemist and academic (b. 1866)
1949 – Hassan al-Banna, Egyptian educator, founded the Muslim Brotherhood (b. 1906)
1954 – Dziga Vertov, Polish-Russian director and screenwriter (b. 1896)
1958 – Douglas Hartree, English mathematician and physicist (b. 1897)
1960 – Oskar Anderson, Bulgarian-German mathematician and academic (b. 1887)
1970 – Clare Turlay Newberry, American author and illustrator (b. 1903)
1971 – James Cash Penney, American businessman and philanthropist, founded J. C. Penney (b. 1875)
1975 – Carl Lutz, Swiss vice-consul to Hungary during WWII, credited with saving over 62,000 Jews (b. 1895)
1976 – Frank Stagg, Irish Republican hunger striker (b. 1941)
1976 – Sal Mineo, American actor (b. 1939)
1977 – Herman Dooyeweerd, Dutch philosopher and scholar (b. 1894)
1979 – Jean Renoir, French actor, director, producer, and screenwriter (b. 1894)
1980 – Muriel Rukeyser, American poet and activist (b. 1913)
1982 – Victor Jory, Canadian-American actor (b. 1902)
1983 – Eubie Blake, American pianist and composer (b. 1887)
1984 – Anna Anderson, Polish-American woman, who claimed to be Grand Duchess Anastasia Nikolaevna of Russia (b. 1896)
  1984   – Julio Cortázar, Belgian-Argentinian author and poet (b. 1914)
1985 – Nicholas Colasanto, American actor and director (b. 1924)
1989 – Thomas Bernhard, Austrian playwright and author (b. 1931)
1991 – Roger Patterson, American bass player (b. 1968)
1992 – Bep van Klaveren, Dutch boxer (b. 1907)
1994 – Donald Judd, American painter and sculptor (b. 1928)
1995 – Philip Taylor Kramer, American bass player (b. 1952)
1998 – Gardner Ackley, American economist and diplomat, United States Ambassador to Italy (b. 1915)
2000 – Tom Landry, American football player and coach (b. 1924)
  2000   – Charles M. Schulz, American cartoonist, created Peanuts (b. 1922)
2001 – Kristina Söderbaum, Swedish-German actress and producer (b. 1912)
2002 – John Eriksen, Danish footballer (b. 1957)
2005 – Dorothy Stang, American-Brazilian nun and missionary (b. 1931)
2007 – Ann Barzel, American writer and dance critic (b. 1905)
  2007   – Peggy Gilbert, American saxophonist and bandleader (b. 1905)
2008 – David Groh, American actor (b. 1939)
2009 – Colgan Air Flight 3407 victims:
Alison Des Forges, American historian and activist (b. 1942)
Beverly Eckert, American activist (b. 1951)
Mat Mathews, Dutch accordion player (b. 1924)
Coleman Mellett, American guitarist (b. 1974)
Gerry Niewood, American saxophonist (b. 1943)
2010 – Nodar Kumaritashvili, Georgian luger (b. 1988)
2011 – Peter Alexander, Austrian singer and actor (b. 1926)
  2011   – Betty Garrett, American actress, singer, and dancer (b. 1919)
  2011   – Kenneth Mars, American actor and comedian (b. 1935)
2012 – Zina Bethune, American actress, dancer, and choreographer (b. 1945)
  2012   – Denis Flannery, Australian rugby player and coach (b. 1928)
  2012   – David Kelly, Irish actor (b. 1929)
  2012   – John Severin, American illustrator (b. 1921)
2013 – Sattam bin Abdulaziz Al Saud, Saudi Arabian prince (b. 1941)
  2013   – Reginald Turnill, English journalist and author (b. 1915)
  2013   – Hennadiy Udovenko, Ukrainian politician and diplomat, 2nd Minister of Foreign Affairs for Ukraine (b. 1931)
2014 – Sid Caesar, American actor and comedian (b. 1922)
  2014   – John Pickstone, English historian and author (b. 1944)
2015 – Movita Castaneda, American actress and singer (b. 1916)
  2015   – Nik Abdul Aziz Nik Mat, Malaysian cleric and politician, 12th Menteri Besar of Kelantan (b. 1931)
  2015   – Gary Owens, American radio host and voice actor (b. 1934)
  2015   – Steve Strange, Welsh singer (b. 1959)
2016 – Dominique D'Onofrio, Italian-Belgian footballer and coach (b. 1953)
  2016   – Yannis Kalaitzis, Greek cartoonist (b. 1945)
  2016   – Yan Su, Chinese general and composer (b. 1930)
2017 – Al Jarreau, American singer (b. 1940)
  2017   – Anna Marguerite McCann, first female American underwater archaeologist (b. 1933)
  2017   – Ren Xinmin, Chinese rocket scientist (b. 1915)
2018 – Bill Crider, American author (b. 1941)
2019 – Gordon Banks, English footballer (b. 1937)
  2019   – Lyndon LaRouche, American political activist (b. 1922)
  2019   – Pedro Morales, Puerto Rican professional wrestler and commentator (b. 1942)
2020 – Christie Blatchford, Canadian newspaper columnist, journalist and broadcaster (b. 1951)
  2020   – Geert Hofstede, Dutch social psychologist (b. 1928)
2022 – Ivan Reitman, Slovak-Canadian actor, director, and producer (b. 1946)

Holidays and observances
 Christian feast day:
 Benedict of Aniane
 Damian (?)
 Julian the Hospitaller
 Martyrs of Abitinae
 February 12 (Eastern Orthodox liturgics)
 Darwin Day (International)
 Georgia Day (Georgia (U.S. state))
 Lincoln's Birthday (United States)
 Red Hand Day (United Nations)
 Union Day (Myanmar)
 Youth Day (Venezuela)

References

External links

 BBC: On This Day
 
 Historical Events on February 12

Days of the year
February